Steinefrenz is an Ortsgemeinde – a community belonging to a Verbandsgemeinde – in the Westerwaldkreis in Rhineland-Palatinate, Germany.

Steinefrenz is located in the administrative district Westerwaldkreis and has a population of 803 people (Dec. 2020).

Geography

The community is located within the Westerwald, between Montabaur and Limburg an der Lahn and 25 km away from Koblenz. It is associated to the Verbandsgemeinde of Wallmerod an association of municipalities having its seat in the same-named town.

History
In 959 Steinefrenz had its first documentary mention as Brencede.

Politics

The municipal council is made up of 12 council members who are elected for a period of four years in a majority vote in a municipal election.

Economy and infrastructure

East of the community runs Bundesstraße 8, linking Limburg an der Lahn and Hennef. The nearest Autobahn interchange is Diez on the A 3 (Cologne–Frankfurt), some 7 km away. The nearest InterCityExpress stops are  Montabaur station and Limburg Süd station on the Cologne-Frankfurt high-speed rail line. It has a station on the Lower Westerwald Railway Unterwesterwaldbahn from Limburg to Siershahn.

References

External links
 Steinefrenz 

Westerwaldkreis